Pál Bogár (2 September 1927 – 17 August 2012) was a Hungarian basketball player who competed in the 1952 Summer Olympics.

Bogár was born in Tés.  He was part of the Hungarian basketball team, which was eliminated after the group stage of the 1952 tournament. He played in all six matches.

References

1927 births
2012 deaths
Hungarian men's basketball players
Olympic basketball players of Hungary
Basketball players at the 1952 Summer Olympics
FIBA EuroBasket-winning players
People from Tés
Sportspeople from Veszprém County